Oliver Ingraham Lay (1845-1890),  was an American portrait painter.

Original art education in the United States. He traveled to Europe in 1860 he returned to the United States and began his professional career as an artist. There was a regular exhibitor Century Association and the National Academy of Design.

Died June 28, 1890, in Stratford, Connecticut. He was buried at the New York Cemetery Cedar Hill Cemetery and Mausoleum.

He was married to Hester Marian Wait Lay (1845-1900), they had a son - Charles Lay (1877-1956) - American architect.

His works are in museum collections in the United States and England, including the National Academy of Design, the Smithsonian American Art Museum, Art Gallery of the Royal Shakespeare Theatre (Stratford-upon-Avon, England).

Gallery

External links
 Oliver Ingraham Lay, Charles Downing Lay, and Lay family papers
 Oliver Ingraham Lay
 

1845 births
1890 deaths
19th-century American painters
American male painters
19th-century male artists
American portrait painters
Cooper Union alumni